Ana Isabel Conde Sánchez (born 16 June 1975 in Fuengirola, Málaga) better known as Anabel Conde is a Spanish singer.

She was chosen by Televisión Española to represent Spain in Eurovision Song Contest 1995, on 13 May in Dublin, (Ireland). Anabel performed the song "Vuelve conmigo", written by Jose María Purón, finishing in second place after the Norwegian entry. She achieved the best position of Spain in Eurovision since 1979. Anabel Conde received 119 points.

After her big success in Eurovision 1995, Anabel withdrew from the profession because of troubles with Jercar, her record label. However, the town of Fuengirola named a square in her honour.

In 2000 she participated in the Spanish national final for the Eurovision Song Contest 2000 in a duet with David Domínguez, performing the song "Ni colores ni fronteras". They finished in fourth place in the national final. In 2005, she returned to Eurovision as a backing singer for the Andorran entrant Marian van de Wal. The next year, she tried to enter for Poland in a duet with her sister Cristina, but failed.

In 2010, she submitted a song to Tu país te necesita, the Spanish selection process for the Eurovision Song Contest 2010. The song was called "Sin miedos". She finished in eighth place in the national final.

References

External links 

 

1975 births
Living people
People from Fuengirola
Eurovision Song Contest entrants for Spain
Eurovision Song Contest entrants of 1995
Singers from Andalusia
21st-century Spanish singers
21st-century Spanish women singers